Cao Hui (born 7 September 1991) is a Chinese female recurve archer and part of the national team and Liaoning team. 
She won the bronze medal at the 2015 Asian Archery Championships in the women's team event.

She represented China at the 2016 Summer Olympics in Rio de Janeiro.

References

 http://www.sandiegouniontribune.com/hoy-san-diego/sdhoy-south-korea-wins-4-golds-spain-1-silver-and-1-2016may16-story.html
 https://web.archive.org/web/20170805145509/http://www.archerygb.org/news/7287.php#.WJjTIVXyvIU
 http://www.gettyimages.com/pictures/cao-hui--archer-16224492#hui-cao-of-china-competes-in-the-womens-individual-round-of-8-round-picture-id588420256

External links
 

1991 births
Living people
Chinese female archers
Place of birth missing (living people)
Olympic archers of China
Archers at the 2016 Summer Olympics
Archers at the 2018 Asian Games
Asian Games competitors for China
21st-century Chinese women